Clay Lane railway station was a small station on the Ashover Light Railway and it served the western area of Clay Cross in North East Derbyshire, England. The station had a wooden shelter and a telephone box. It was located about a quarter of a mile from the main street in Clay Cross, near the Royal Oak public house. The points were laid for a siding, but this was never built, due to meagre goods traffic. Despite this, passenger traffic was initially good. After closure in 1950. The site was demolished and nothing remains of the station or trackbed.

References

Disused railway stations in Derbyshire
Former London, Midland and Scottish Railway stations